Nordstromia nigra is a moth in the family Drepanidae. It was described by Hong-Fu Chu and Lin-Yao Wang in 1988. It is found in China (Sichuan, Yunnan) as well as Thailand.

References

Moths described in 1988
Drepaninae